Kaaren Verne (6 April 1918 – 23 December 1967) was a German-born actress, long based in the United States. Sometimes billed as Karen Verne, she was originally a stage actress and member of the Berlin State Theatre.

Life and career
Verne was born in Berlin and christened Ingeborg Greta Katerina Marie-Rose Klinckerfuss. Related to the Bechstein family, her first marriage took place when she was 18. She fled the Nazis in 1938 and made her English language film début in the 1939 British film Ten Days in Paris. When British film production stopped during World War II, she emigrated to the USA. At first, the studios tried to downplay her German heritage by briefly changing her professional name to Catherine Young, but after America's entry into World War II, the publicity value of a Teutonic actress who had turned her back on Nazism was too good to avoid.

Verne was married three times, to:
 Musician Arthur Young (30 August 1936 – May 1945; divorced); 1 son, Alastair (1937–2015) 
 Actor Peter Lorre (25 May 1945 – 1950; divorced)
 Film historian James Powers (1951 – December 23, 1967; her death)

Verne and James Powers adopted Peter Lorre's daughter, Catharine Lorre Baker (1953–1985), following his death in 1964.

An Associated Press news story published January 19, 1955, tells that Verne obtained a divorce decree from Harold R. Susman, who was described as "sales director for a clothing manufacturer."

Kaaren Verne remained in films until her death, appearing in Ship of Fools (1965).

Death
Verne died at age 49 of a reported heart ailment in Hollywood, California. She was interred in Calvary Cemetery, St Paul, Minnesota.

Filmography

Films
Ten Days in Paris (1940) - Diane de Guermantes
Sky Murder (1940) - Pat Evans
The Wild Man of Borneo (1941) - Actress in Film Scene (uncredited)
Underground (1941) - Sylvia Helmuth
All Through the Night (1942) - Leda Hamilton
Kings Row (1942) - Elise Sandor
The Great Impersonation (1942) - Baroness Stephanie Idenbraum
Sherlock Holmes and the Secret Weapon (1942) - Charlotte Eberli
The Seventh Cross (1944) - Leni 
The Bad and the Beautiful (1952) - Rosa (uncredited)
The Story of Three Loves (1953) - Madame Legay (segment "Equilibrium") (uncredited)
The Juggler (1953) - Woman Mistaken for Hans' Wife (uncredited)
A Bullet for Joey (1955) - Viveca Hartman
Outside the Law (1956) - Mrs. Pulenski
Silk Stockings (1957) - Postwoman (uncredited)
Ship of Fools (1965) - Frau Lutz
Madame X (1966) - Nurse Riborg (final film role)

Television
Fireside Theatre (1954) - Anna
Crusader (1 episode, 1956) - Mrs. Hawelka
The Gale Storm Show (1 episode, 1956) - Marya Jezek
General Electric Theater (1 episode, 1958) - Frau Schuman
Bronco (1 episode, 1959) - Ilse von Waldenheim
Michael Shayne (1 episode, 1960) - Flora
The Twilight Zone (1 episode, 1961) - Innkeeper
The Untouchables (1 episode, 1961) - Mrs. Schoenbrun—Landlady
Kraft Suspense Theatre (1 episode, 1965) - Inge
The Duel at Mont Saint Marie (1966, TV episode)
12 O'Clock High (1 episode, 1966) - Woman Refugee

See also

References
Notes

External links

1918 births
1967 deaths
American film actresses
German stage actresses
Actresses from Berlin
20th-century American actresses
20th-century German actresses
Emigrants from Nazi Germany to the United States
American television actresses